Huyton was a former constituency for the House of Commons. Created in 1950, it was centred on Huyton in Lancashire (later Merseyside), North West England, just beyond the borders of the city of Liverpool. The only MP was frontbench Labour politician, Harold Wilson who while representing the seat became Leader of the Labour Party in 1963 and Prime Minister from 1964 to 1970 and again from 1974 to 1976.

The constituency was dissolved under 1983 boundary changes—largely replaced by Knowsley South. This coincided with Wilson's retirement from Parliament.

Opposition parties
The Liberals ran a candidate in the constituency on its creation in 1950 but did not run one again until 24 years later in 1974, by which time Wilson had become Leader of the Labour Party and served two terms as Prime Minister. The party finished in third place in all the elections it contested in this seat. Wilson achieved an absolute majority, save in the 1950 election, the runner up party always a Conservative party candidate, who polled best in 1951 with 48.7% of the vote.

Political forebears
The Widnes seat was, in the early 20th century, a marginal seat: in the elections immediately preceding 1950, it alternated between the two largest parties.

Urbanisation
The seat was more suburban at a time of relatively low employment in the sub-region in the 1950s. Council housing and private sector construction of relatively smaller homes by the 1980s complimented the overwhelmingly semi-detached housing stock, downgrading the local housing stock during the seat's existence while solving the problem of chronic housing shortages in the city itself; a time when Merseyside expanded by a programme of home building and motorway building within the confines of Huyton and its suburbs moved further out particularly to the Wirral and other areas on the fringe of the new metropolitan county. The M57 was completed bisecting the area in 1974, so also the M62.

Election expenses and type of returning officer
The seat was classified as a higher-level expenses and returning officer county constituency rather than a borough constituency.

Boundaries
1950–1974: The Urban Districts of Huyton-with-Roby and Prescot, and in the Rural District of Whiston the parishes of Eccleston, Kirkby, Knowsley, and Windle.

1974–1983: As prior less Kirkby. This was transferred to the redrawn Ormskirk constituency.

Members of Parliament

Election results

Elections in the 1950s

Elections in the 1960s

Elections in the 1970s

See also
Knowsley South parliamentary constituency

References

Sources

Election results, 1950 - 1979 

Parliamentary constituencies in North West England (historic)
Constituencies of the Parliament of the United Kingdom established in 1950
Constituencies of the Parliament of the United Kingdom disestablished in 1983
Constituencies of the Parliament of the United Kingdom represented by a sitting Prime Minister